Katie McBeath (born February 12, 1994) is an American pair skater.

Career

Partnership with Bartholomay 
At the end of May 2020, McBeath and Nathan Bartholomay announced that they had teamed up and were training in Irvine, California under Jenni Meno, Todd Sand, Christine Binder, and Chris Knierim.. They made their debut as a pair as at the virtual ISP Points Challenge where they were seventh. They also placed 7th at their debut as a pair at the 2021 U.S. Championships.

McBeath/Bartholomay placed 7th in their international debut at the 2021 Cranberry and then debuted on the Challenger series at the 2021 CS Autumn Classic International, finishing 5th. They placed 5th at the 2022 U.S. Championships and then went on to finish 5th at the 2022 Four Continents.

Programs

Pairs with Bartholomay

With McBeath

Women's singles

Competitive highlights 
GP: Grand Prix; CS: Challenger Series

With Bartholomay

Women's singles

References 

American female pair skaters
1994 births
Living people
21st-century American women